Axelella is a genus of sea snails, marine gastropod mollusks in the family Cancellariidae, the nutmeg snails.

Species
Species within the genus Axelella include:
 Axelella campbelli (Shasky, 1961)
 Axelella funiculata (Hinds, 1843)
 Axelella scalatella (Guppy, 1873)
 Axelella smithii (Dall, 1888)

Species brought into synonymy 
 Axelella brasiliensis Verhecken, 1991: synonym of Pseudobabylonella brasiliensis (Verhecken, 1991)
 Axelella kastoroae Verhecken, 1997: synonym of Nipponaphera kastoroae
 Axelella minima (Reeve, 1856): synonym of Pseudobabylonella minima
 Axelella nodosivaricosa (Petush, 1979): synonym of Nipponaphera nodosivaricosa
 Axelella semipellucida (A. Adams & Reeve, 1850): synonym of Nipponaphera semipellucida
 Axelella suduirauti Verhecken, 1999: synonym of Nipponaphera suduirauti (Verhecken, 1999)

References

 Gofas, S.; Le Renard, J.; Bouchet, P. (2001). Mollusca, in: Costello, M.J. et al. (Ed.) (2001). European register of marine species: a check-list of the marine species in Europe and a bibliography of guides to their identification. Collection Patrimoines Naturels, 50: pp. 180–213
 Hemmen J. (2007). Recent Cancellariidae., Hemmen J. (2007) Recent Cancellariidae. Annotated and illustrated catalogue of Recent Cancellariidae. Privately published, Wiesbaden. 428 pp. [With amendments and corrections taken from Petit R.E. (2012) A critique of, and errata for, Recent Cancellariidae by Jens Hemmen, 2007. Conchologia Ingrata 9: 1-8Wiesbaden, 428pp

External links